Rhinorhynchus is a weevil genus.

References

External links 
 

Weevil genera